Allen Slagle is an American politician and a Republican member of the Wyoming House of Representatives representing the 2nd district since January 10, 2023.

Political career

After incumbent Republican representative Hans Hunt resigned his seat to join the staff of U.S. Senator Cynthia Lummis, county commissioners within the 2nd district's boundaries appointed J. D. Williams to the seat. Slagle ran in the Republican primary on August 16, 2022, and defeated Williams by 12 votes, and then won the general election on November 8, 2022, unopposed.

References

External links
Profile from Ballotpedia

Living people
Republican Party members of the Wyoming House of Representatives
People from Douglas, Wyoming
University of Wyoming alumni
21st-century American politicians
Year of birth missing (living people)